Hynek Kmoníček (born 22 October 1962) is a Czech diplomat and the current Czech Republic Ambassador to the United States. Previously, Kmoníček served as foreign policy advisor of the President Miloš Zeman, and held ambassadorial posts under all three post-Communist presidents of the Czech Republic, including as Czech Permanent Representative to the United Nations in New York and subsequently as Ambassador to India and later Australia.

Early life and education 
Kmoníček was born in Pardubice, then Czechoslovakia. He graduated from the University of South Bohemia, with a master's degree in classical guitar and pedagogy, and later earned degrees in English language studies and Classical Arabic studies from Charles University. He also completed a post-graduate program in the modern history of the Middle East at the Hebrew University of Jerusalem (Young Jewish Leaders in Diaspora, Rothberg Overseas Program). At Hebrew University, his specialization was medieval Islamic mysticism. His graduation thesis was entitled "Al-Miraj of Abu Yazid al-Bistami". His political science graduation paper was titled "Historical development of Saudi-American relations from the beginning to the JFK era."

Career 
Kmoníček started his diplomatic career in 1995 as a desk officer at the Middle East Department of the Ministry of Foreign Affairs. He became director of this Department in 1997. In 1999, Kmoníček was promoted to the position of Director General of Asia, Africa and America. His next promotion came in June 1999, when he was named Deputy Minister, with responsibility for Czech bilateral relations with all non-EU countries. He held this position until 2001.

From 2001 to 2006, Kmoníček served as Czech Ambassador to the United Nations in New York. As a member of the UN General Assembly, Kmoníček served as Chairman of the Fifth Committee, which is responsible for administration and budgetary matters. Between 2006 and 2009, he was Czech Ambassador in India, also responsible for Bangladesh, Nepal, the Maldives and Sri Lanka. In this role, Kmoníček lobbied the Czech government in favour of helping the Sri Lankan government during the civil war, which included arms and the air bridge to Jaffna.

In 2009, he was appointed to the position of Deputy Foreign Minister for Legal, Consular, and Current Political Issues.
After his removal from the position of Deputy Foreign Minister in July 2010, Foreign Minister Karel Schwarzenberg nominated him for the post of Czech Ambassador in Australia, also responsible for New Zealand, Cook Islands, Fiji, Solomon Islands, Tonga, Vanuatu, and Samoa. Schwarzenberg was reported to have commented that if possible, he would rather have sent Kmoníček to Mars.

A longtime friend of President Milos Zeman, Kmoníček joined the Presidential Office on 28 March 2013 as Director of the Foreign Department with primary responsibility for the President's policy on foreign affairs. He is considered to be a key figure within the Zeman administration, advising the president on Middle Eastern, Asian and American affairs. In 2015, he was credited by the US Ambassador Andrew Schapiro as having resolved a diplomatic dispute between Schapiro and Zeman. As one of only a few Czech Social Democratic Party members in the Presidential Office, he is considered to be an interlocutor between the prime minister, the foreign minister and the president.

Since March 2017, Kmoníček has been serving as Czech Ambassador to the United States. He presented his credentials to President Donald Trump on 24 April 2017. He has also retained his post of foreign policy adviser to the Czech President.

In 2015, a Czech scientist who discovered a new species of beetle named it after Kmoníček as a token of a gratitude for assistance he had provided as ambassador.

Since 2015 he has been writing about foreign affairs for the Czech newspaper MF Dnes as an external contributor.

Personal life 

Kmoníček's personal interests include cooking and collecting documentary movies, world music and hot sauces from around the world. He also writes reviews for art, culture and academic journals worldwide. In a profile in August 2018 for CBS News, his house in Washington DC was shown to be decorated with trophies from various animals he had killed around the world as part of his diplomatic activities.

References 

1962 births
People from Pardubice
Ambassadors of the Czech Republic to the United States
Charles University alumni
Hebrew University of Jerusalem alumni
Living people
Permanent Representatives of the Czech Republic to the United Nations
Ambassadors of the Czech Republic to India
Ambassadors of the Czech Republic to Bangladesh
Ambassadors of the Czech Republic to Nepal
Ambassadors of the Czech Republic to the Maldives
Ambassadors of the Czech Republic to Sri Lanka
Ambassadors of the Czech Republic to Australia
Ambassadors of the Czech Republic to New Zealand
Ambassadors of the Czech Republic to Tonga
Ambassadors of the Czech Republic to Samoa
Ambassadors of the Czech Republic to the Cook Islands
Ambassadors of the Czech Republic to Fiji
Ambassadors of the Czech Republic to the Solomon Islands
Ambassadors of the Czech Republic to Vanuatu
University of South Bohemia alumni